Maksakov, or Maksakova (feminine; Макса′кова), is a Russian surname and may refer to:

Ivan Maksakov (born 1983), one of the three men behind a series of DDoS attacks 
Lyudmila Maksakova (born 1940), Soviet/Russian theater and film actress, daughter of Maria Maksakova Sr.
Maria Maksakova Jr. (born 1977), Russian and Ukrainian opera singer, daughter of Lyudmila Maksakova
Maria Maksakova Sr. (1902–1974), Russian and Soviet opera singer
Maximilian Maksakov (1869–1936), Austrian and Russian opera singer